Hut Point Peninsula is a long, narrow peninsula from  wide and  long, projecting south-west from the slopes of Mount Erebus on Ross Island, Antarctica. McMurdo Station (US) and Scott Base (NZ) are Antarctic research stations located on the Hut Point Peninsula.

History 

Members of the British Antarctic Expedition, 1910–13 (BAE), under Scott, wintering on Cape Evans and often using the hut during their journeys, came to refer to the whole peninsula as the Hut Point Peninsula.

Historic sites and monuments 
Several features on Hut Point, including the cross memorial for George Vince and the store hut for the Scott expeditions, are protected under the Antarctic Treaty. Both the cross (HSM 19) and the hut (HSM 18) have been designated Historic Sites or Monuments, following proposals by New Zealand and the United Kingdom to the Antarctic Treaty Consultative Meeting. The point is protected as Antarctic Specially Protected Area No.158 largely because of its historic significance as one of the principal sites of early human activity in Antarctica.

Geography 
A number of features on Hut Point Peninsula have been charted and named by various Antarctic expeditions.

On the west coast, south of the Erebus Ice Tongue, is Descent Cliff, charted and named by BAE members because they descended to the sea ice from it. South of that are the Hutton Cliffs, named by the Discovery Expedition (DE) of 1901–04 for Captain Hutton of the Canterbury Museum, Christchurch, New Zealand. To the south is Rodgers Point, named in 2000 by the New Zealand Geographic Board after Thelma Rodgers, the first woman to winter at Scott Base.  south is Knob Point, a rounded coastal point. This name was adopted by the United States Advisory Committee on Antarctic Names (US-ACAN) as it was already in use by fieldworkers in the area. Just south is Danger Slopes, a steep ice slope terminating west in a sheer drop to Erebus Bay. It was named by DE personnel because Seaman George T. Vince of the expedition lost his life here in a blizzard when he slipped and fell into the sea. The southernmost point of the peninsula is Cape Armitage, named by Scott's expedition for Lieutenant (later Captain) Albert Armitage, second in command and navigator on the Discovery.

It was discovered by DE personnel, and named because they kept a Norwegian 'pram' (dinghy) there to get to the Ross Ice Shelf during the summer months. New Zealand Antarctic Scott Base is on Pram Point. North of Pram Point is ice-covered Polar Bear Point. The name, given by US-ACAN, is allusive; when viewed from the west, the appearance of the point is suggestive of the head, neck and fore part of a polar bear. Farther north is Ackley Point, named by US-ACAN for sea ice specialist Stephen F. Ackley.

Geology 
Hut Point Peninsula consists of a series of basaltic scoria cones, craters and domes that were formed in the last 1.34 million years. Named cones, domes and craters on the peninsula include:

Cones, domes and other protrusions 

 Black Knob
 Boulder Cones
 Breached Cone
 Castle Rock
 Centipede Nunatak
 Cone Hill
 Crater Hill
 Ford Rock
 Fortress Rocks
 Observation Hill
 Sulfur Cones

Craters 

 First Crater
 Half Moon Crater
 Second Crater
 Sheppard Crater
 Twin Crater

References 

 

Landforms of Ross Island
Antarctic Specially Protected Areas
Historic Sites and Monuments of Antarctica
1910s establishments in Antarctica